Solo Avengers was an American comic book series published by Marvel Comics, and was a spin-off from the company's superhero team title The Avengers. It was published for 20 issues (December 1987–July 1989) until it was renamed Avengers Spotlight with issue #21 (August 1989). The series was cancelled as of issue #40 (January 1991).

The format of the title was usually two stories, one featuring the character Hawkeye and the other a back-up strip showcasing a current or former member of the Avengers. With issue #35, the format changed to exclusively focus on one full-length story.

Artist Amanda Conner's first published work in the comics industry was the 11–page Yellowjacket back-up story in Solo Avengers #12 (November 1988).

Solo Avengers

Avengers Spotlight

Avengers: Solo
In December 2011, a five-part limited series titled Avengers: Solo was released following the same format as Solo Avengers. Once again, the central story, written by Jen Van Meter and illustrated by Roger Robinson, starred Hawkeye with the cast of Avengers Academy, by Jim McCann and Clayton Harris, in the back-up story.

Collected editions
 Avengers: Solo Avengers Classic collects Solo Avengers #1–10, 240 pages, February 2012, 
 Avengers: Scarlet Witch includes the Scarlet Witch story from Solo Avengers #5, 232 pages, April 2015,

References

External links
 Solo Avengers at Comicvine
 Avengers Spotlight at Comicvine
 Solo Avengers at Marvel Database
 Avengers Spotlight at Marvel Database

1987 comics debuts
1991 comics endings
Comics anthologies
Comics by Fabian Nicieza
Comics by Steve Gerber
Defunct American comics
Superhero comics